Shaldeh (also Romanized as Shāldeh; also known as Shaldy) is a village in Jirdeh Rural District, in the Central District of Shaft County, Gilan Province, Iran. At the 2006 census, its population was 1,188, in 288 families.

References 

Populated places in Shaft County